Abram is the Biblical patriarch.

Abram may also refer to:

 Abram (name) (includes variant forms and other people with this name)
 Abram, Lodz Voivodeship, a village in Poland
 Abram, Bihor, a commune in west Romania
 Abram, Greater Manchester, a village in England, UK
 Abram (ward), an electoral ward in Wigan, England, UK
 M1 Abrams a battle tank

See also
Abraham (disambiguation)
Avram (disambiguation)